Naeem Akhtar (born June 8, 1961) is a Pakistani field hockey player. He was born in Abbottabad. He won a gold medal at the 1984 Summer Olympics in Los Angeles.

References

External links
 

1961 births
Living people
Sportspeople from Abbottabad
Pakistani male field hockey players
Olympic field hockey players of Pakistan
Field hockey players at the 1984 Summer Olympics
Field hockey players at the 1988 Summer Olympics
Olympic gold medalists for Pakistan
Olympic medalists in field hockey
Medalists at the 1984 Summer Olympics
20th-century Pakistani people